Mikaël Gabriel "Miki" Cantave (born 25 October 1996) is a professional footballer who plays as a midfielder for Cavalry FC. Born in Canada, he represents the Haiti national team.

Early life
Born in Ottawa, Cantave began playing soccer at age five with FC Capital United. At age 13, he moved to France joining the FC Nantes academy. Afterwards he went to Nacional (France) before reaching the Getafe sub19,

Club career
In January 2016, he signed with Spanish club Guadalajara in the third tier Segunda División B. He made his debut on March 13 against La Roda. In August 2016, he left the club after making only three appearances for a total of 56 minutes.

Later in 2016, he joined RSD Alcalá B, followed by playing for Albacete B, Lorca FC B, and Deportivo Rayo Cantabria.

Later in 2018, he joined CD Tropezón.

In 2019, he joined CD Lealtad. He scored his first goal in a preseason friendly against Sporting de Gijón B on July 31. He scored his first official goal on August 25, on a penalty kick, against Lenense. He scored a brace on January 12, 2020 against Lenense.

In 2020, he joined CD Olímpic de Xàtiva. He scored his first goal on November 21 against UD Benigàmin. He departed the club at the end of 2020.

In January 2021, he joined CP Villarrobledo in the Segunda División B. He scored his first goal for Villarrobledo on February 10 against Melilla in the 94th minute to earn a 1-1 draw.

In August 2021, he joined Romanian club AFC Chindia Târgoviște in the top tier Liga I.

In July 2022, he returned to his native Canada and signed a multi-year deal with Canadian Premier League side Cavalry FC. He made his debut for Cavalry on July 28 against Forge FC. In the reverse fixture on August 12, Cantave scored his first goal, a late winner in a 2-1 victory over the Hammers at ATCO Field.

International career
Born in Canada, Cantave's father is from Haiti and his mother is from Guadeloupe.

Cantave represented Canada at the 2013 CONCACAF U-17 Championship earning a bronze medal and at the 2013 FIFA U-17 World Cup.

In 2018, he switched allegiance to Haiti. He made his international debut on 29 May 2018 in a friendly match against Argentina. He scored his first goal on November 17, 2018 in his official competitive debut against Nicaragua in 2019–20 CONCACAF Nations League qualifying.

Personal life
His father is from Haiti, while his mother is from the French overseas department of Guadeloupe.

Career statistics

International stats

International goals
Haiti score listed first, score column indicates score after each Cantave goal.

Honours

Club
CD Lealtad
Tercera División: 2019–20

National
Haiti
CONCACAF Gold Cup bronze: 2019

References

External links

1996 births
Living people
Citizens of Haiti through descent
Haitian people of French descent
Canadian sportspeople of Haitian descent
Canadian people of French descent
Black Canadian soccer players
Soccer players from Ottawa
Haitian footballers
Canadian soccer players
Association football midfielders
Haitian expatriate footballers
Canadian expatriate soccer players
Expatriate footballers in France
Expatriate footballers in Spain
Haitian expatriate sportspeople in France
Haitian expatriate sportspeople in Spain
Canadian expatriate sportspeople in France
Canadian expatriate sportspeople in Spain
Canada men's youth international soccer players
Haiti international footballers
2019 CONCACAF Gold Cup players
FC Nantes players
USJA Carquefou players
Segunda División B players
Tercera División players
Divisiones Regionales de Fútbol players
Liga I players
Canadian Premier League players
Getafe CF footballers
CD Guadalajara (Spain) footballers
Atlético Albacete players
Deportivo Rayo Cantabria players
CD Tropezón players
CD Lealtad players 
CD Olímpic de Xàtiva footballers
CP Villarrobledo players
AFC Chindia Târgoviște players
Cavalry FC players